Date and time notation in New Zealand most commonly records the date using the day-month-year format, while the ISO 8601 format is increasingly used for all-numeric dates, such as date of birth. The time can be written using either the 12-hour clock or the 24-hour clock.

Date 
New Zealanders typically write the date with the day leading, as in the United Kingdom and Australia:

 
  or 

The month–day–year order is sometimes used, usually informally in the mastheads of magazines, schools, newspapers, advertisements, video games, news, and TV shows. However, similar to the UK, the MDY in numeric-only form is never used as it can be easily confused for the DMY format. 

Weeks are most identified by the last day of the week, either the Friday in business (e.g., "week ending 19/1") or the Sunday in other use (e.g., "week ending 21/1").

Time 
The New Zealand Government readability guidelines recommend writing showing the time in a 12-hour format, although the 24-hour clock can be used in technical fields such as military, aviation, computing, navigation, transportation and the sciences. The before noon/after noon qualifier is usually written as "am" or "pm". A colon is the preferred time separator. New Zealanders are also recommended to use "midnight" instead of "00:00" in writing. UTC time is used in some cases by the New Zealand land service information data service.

References 

Time in New Zealand
New Zealand